is a former Japanese football player.

Playing career
Kaburaki was born in Shinagawa, Tokyo on August 26, 1977. In 1999, when he was Kokushikan University student, he joined J1 League club Yokohama F. Marinos. In June 1999, he moved to Júbilo Iwata 3 months on loan. In 2001, he moved to FC Tokyo. In 2002, he moved to Vissel Kobe. In March 2002, he moved to J2 League club Avispa Fukuoka. However he could not play at all in the match in these clubs until 2002. In 2003, he moved to J2 club Mito HollyHock. He played many matches as regular goalkeeper until May 2003. However he could hardly play in the match behind Koji Homma from May. In 2005, he moved to Japan Football League club FC Horikoshi (later Arte Takasaki). He played as regular goalkeeper in 2 seasons. In August 2006, he moved to Prefectural Leagues club Tonan SC (later Tonan Maebashi). The club was promoted to Regional Leagues from 2009. He played for top team until 2012 season.

Club statistics

References

External links

1977 births
Living people
Kokushikan University alumni
Association football people from Tokyo
Japanese footballers
J1 League players
J2 League players
Japan Football League players
Yokohama F. Marinos players
Júbilo Iwata players
FC Tokyo players
Vissel Kobe players
Avispa Fukuoka players
Mito HollyHock players
Arte Takasaki players
Association football goalkeepers